Micropterix gaudiella is a species of moth belonging to the family Micropterigidae. It was described by Zeller and Huemer in 2015. It occurs in Italy.

Etymology
The species name is derived from the Latin gaudium (meaning fun, pleasure, happiness). The genus name Micropterix is derived from Greek mikros (little) and pterux (wing).

Distribution and behaviour

The species is known only from the mountain Pizzo Arera in the southern Orobic Alps in Lombardy, Italy, at an elevation of approximately 1,600 meters on south-facing exposed limestone slopes. Adults feed on pollen of Rosa spp. and Helianthemum spp., and have been recorded on wing during late June and early–mid July.

Description

Immature stages
The immature stages of Micropterix gaudiella have not yet been described.

Adults
The blueish forewings are strongly marked with three broad bronze-golden bands at 1/4th, 1/2nd and 3/4th of the wing. The first of these is trapeziform; the second is straight and inwardly oblique; and the final band is inwardly convex and variable in shape. The forewing's fringe is bronzy golden, and bluish violet at the base. The hindwings are bronzy golden, with a purplish tinge at the apex. The fringe is bronzy golden. 

With a forewing length of 3.5–3.9 mm, male specimens of Micropterix gaudiella are smaller than their female counterparts (4–4.4 mm forewing length).

References

Micropterigidae
Moths described in 2015
Moths of Europe